= Girl Hunting =

- Directed by: Sadegh Bahrami; Ali Daryabegi
- Produced by: Mohsen Badi; Fazlollah Manouchehri
- Cinematography: Mohsen Badi
- Production company: Badi
- Release date: 1 November 1951
- Running time: 90 minutes
- Country: Iran
- Language: Persian

Girl Hunting (Persian: Shekare khanegi) is a 1951 Iranian comedy film directed by Sadegh Bahrami and Ali Daryabegi.

== Cast ==
- Sadegh Bahrami
- Asghar Tafakori

== Bibliography ==
- Mohammad Ali Issari. Cinema in Iran, 1900-1979. Scarecrow Press, 1989.
